USS Sharps (AG-139/AKL-10) was a Camano-class cargo ship constructed for the U.S. Army as USA FS-385 shortly before the end of  World War II and later acquired by the U.S. Navy in 1947. She was configured as a transport and cargo ship and was assigned to serve the World War II Trust Territories in the Pacific Ocean. She later served with distinction in the Korean War.

Constructed in Decatur, Alabama 
Sharps (AG-139) was built in 1944 by Ingalls Shipbuilding Corp., Decatur, Alabama; operated by the U.S. Army as a freight supply ship (USA FS-385) in the Pacific Ocean until being transferred to the Navy at Guam in March 1947. She was converted to Navy use and commissioned there on 3 August 1947.

Trust territory service
One of a group of small Army cargo ships transferred to the Navy for use among the Pacific islands, Sharps provided logistic support to the Trust Territories of the Marshall Islands and the Caroline Islands.

In August 1949, Sharps sailed to Pearl Harbor for an overhaul. From there, she steamed to American Samoa. She arrived there on 4 November 1949 and served as station ship for the next 10 months. She returned to Pearl Harbor and served as an ammunition disposal ship until she was overhauled in late 1951.

Korean War service
When the yard work was completed, Sharps stood out of Pearl Harbor and sailed for Sasebo, Japan. She operated out of that port from 3 November 1951 until 17 May 1952, supporting the United Nations' forces in Inchon and Pohang, Korea. Sharps returned to Guam and central Pacific operations until her home port was again changed to Sasebo on 9 August 1954. She operated in Japanese waters until November 1955 when she sailed for Pearl Harbor, en route to the United States.

Post-war decommissioning
Sharps arrived at Astoria, Oregon, on 13 December 1955. In March 1956, she moved to Seattle, Washington; and, on 3 April,  she was  leased to South Korea as Kun San (AKL-908).

Honors and awards
Sharps received three battle stars for Korean War service:
 UN Summer-Fall Offensive
 Second Korean Winter
 Korean Defense Summer-Fall 1952

References
  
 NavSource Online: Service Ship Photo Archive - FS-385 - AG-139 / AKL-10 Sharps

 

Ships of the United States Army
Design 381 coastal freighters
Ships built in Decatur, Alabama
1944 ships
World War II auxiliary ships of the United States
Camano-class cargo ships
Korean War auxiliary ships of the United States
Ships transferred from the United States Navy to the Republic of Korea Navy